Atlantis was a German charter airline based at Frankfurt Airport.

History
The airline was established in 1966 as Nordseeflug Sylter Lufttransport and started seasonal scheduled services the same year with a Douglas DC-3 from Hamburg to Westerland. 

In 1968 it was renamed to Atlantis and received a permit from the Civil Aeronautics Board to operate transatlantic inclusive-tour flights to the United States with Douglas DC-8. Atlantis also operated affinity group charter flights and charter flights to destinations in the Mediterranean with McDonnell Douglas DC-9. 

Despite the airline's cooperation with several tour operators it ceased operations on 19 October 1972 due to an uncertain financial perspective.

Fleet

Atlantis operated the following aircraft during its existence:
 1 Douglas DC-3
 1 Douglas DC-7
 5 Douglas DC-8
 3 Douglas DC-9

References

External links

Defunct airlines of Germany